Estadio Benito Juárez was a stadium in Oaxaca, Mexico. It held about 10,250 people and was primarily used for soccer. Construction began in 1984, the stadium was opened in 1987, and was closed and demolished in 2015.

References 

Sports venues in Oaxaca